The lesser sheath-tailed bat (Emballonura monticola) is a species of sac-winged bat in the family Emballonuridae. It is found in the Malay Peninsula (including Myanmar and Thailand), Borneo, and many other parts of the Indonesian Archipelago including Sulawesi, Java, and Sumatra.

References

Emballonura
Bats of Southeast Asia
Bats of Indonesia
Bats of Malaysia
Mammals of Borneo
Mammals of Myanmar
Mammals of Thailand
Mammals of Sulawesi
Mammals described in 1838
Taxa named by Coenraad Jacob Temminck
Taxonomy articles created by Polbot